Mukulu may be,

Mukulu language
The Mokilko language of Chad
The Mukulu dialect of Zambia
Jamil Mukulu

See also
Cardiocorax mukulu (sp. plesiosaur)